SWMRS (formerly Emily's Army), pronounced 'swimmers', are an American punk rock band formed in Piedmont, California in 2004 by Cole Becker and Joey Armstrong, with Becker's brother Max Becker joining only a few weeks afterwards. They drew on a mix of influences ranging from the Beach Boys to the Ramones to create their own brand of rock. The band added Travis Neumann in 2009, who later left in 2014 due to creative differences. The band released a demo and a string of EPs from 2008 to 2010. The band released their first album, Don't Be a Dick, on June 14, 2011. The band's second album, Lost at Seventeen, was released on June 11, 2013. They added Sebastian Mueller as the bassist in 2014.  The band's third studio album, and their first under the name SWMRS after dropping their former name, Drive North, was released February 12, 2016, via Uncool Records. Drive North was later re-released after the band was signed to record label Fueled by Ramen on October 13, 2016.

History

The band was formed by Cole Becker and Joey Armstrong after watching School of Rock together in school. Becker's brother, Max Becker, later joined the band to play bass. The band was originally named the Raining Souls, but they briefly changed to the Clocks. After realizing there were already many bands with the same name, they changed it to Emily's Army in honor to the Becker's cousin Emily, who suffers from cystic fibrosis and was diagnosed in 1998. Their goal was to raise money and create more awareness for cystic fibrosis. In 2008, they released a set of songs on their MySpace page under the album name This Kid. Although This Kid is not an official studio album, a few of these songs appeared throughout their career, including "Burn Apollo" that was re-recorded on their debut album, Queens being played live in 2012, and "I Need to Be Fixed" played live during Warped Tour 2012.

The band played many small shows and festivals in California during this time. In 2009 the band added guitarist Travis Neumann whose first appearance was on the band's 2009 EP, Goody Two Shoes. that was followed by the release of two more EPs, Broadcast This and Regan MacNeil. The band spent all of 2010 working and recording their first studio album with Green Day frontman and Joey's father, Billie Joe Armstrong. In 2011, the band released their first full-length album, Don't Be a Dick, on June 14 through Adeline Records. The album featured six re-recorded songs from their earlier releases. The album was compared to Green Day's early work and had major punk influences. In support of the album the band went on an East and West Coast tour in 2011. In late 2011 and early 2012, the band resided in Tulsa OK, playing underground punk shows. In 2012 the band returned to touring, most notably on Warped Tour and a brief West Coast tour in late 2012.

In 2013, the band once again worked with producer Billie Joe Armstrong, on their second record. Lost at Seventeen, was released on June 11, 2013 via Adeline Records and Rise Records. The band went on tour with Vans Warped Tour to support the album for the second time in their career. They also toured for the very first time in Great Britain. They played their final shows as Emily's Army during the Soundwave Festival in 2015 in Australia. Since soundwave 2015 the band has stopped playing material released before Swim in favor of playing new music.

In early 2014 the band started writing and recording new material. Travis Neumann officially left the band shortly after the release of their EP Swim, on July 18, 2014, consequently, bassist Sebastian Mueller joined the band while Max switched to lead guitar. In September 2014 the band officially changed their name to "Swimmers". Before this change was made, Swimmers was the name that the band used as a low key name for a small UK tour with Matt Grocott & The Shrives and Wasters. The band released their first song as Swimmers, a cover of "Dancing on My Own", by Robyn in October 2014. The band announced that they would be releasing an EP, Silver Bullets/Palm Trees on March 30, 2015. In March 2015, the band announced that Silver Bullets/Palm Trees release would be delayed and that Jakob Armstrong, brother of drummer Joey, would be filling in for, and subsequently replacing, bassist Seb Mueller, who had to take college exams. On March 28, 2015 at Burgerama, bassist Seb Mueller returned to the band. The release of Silver Bullets/Palm Trees was eventually shelved.

Their third studio album was produced by Fidlar lead vocalist Zac Carper. On June 22, the band announced a September Tour along with Wavves and Twin Peaks. The band released four songs via SoundCloud in July 2015, two of which were uploaded by themselves, the other two, "Stink Eye", by Frankenshark—an early side-project that the band uses in live sets—and a leaked song, "Like Harry Dean Stanton".

The band announced that they will be releasing two songs Miley/Uncool, on September 8, 2015 on their own indie label Uncool Records. The EP's first single, "Miley", was released as a single on September 7, 2015. The band would also start stylizing their name as "SWMRS" (instead of "Swimmers") in August 2015. Physical copies of the EP were made available on the band's tour with Wavves. After the release of the EP, SWMRS received mainstream media coverage due to the song "Miley". The band announced their upcoming Drive North on November 6, 2015 and released single "Figuring It Out". The album released on February 12, 2016 via Uncool Records.

As of October 13, 2016, SWMRS signed with pop punk label Fueled by Ramen. This announcement was made by Annie Mac on BBC1 Radio, along with the release of SWMRS' song, Palm Trees. The following day, Drive North was rereleased under Fueled by Ramen with two additional songs: "Palm Trees" and "Lose It".

On February 15, 2019, they released their second album under the SWMRS name, Berkeley's on Fire. The band were nominated for 'Best International Newcomer' at the 2019 Kerrang! Awards, ultimately going on to win the award.

On October 28, 2019, guitarist Max Becker along with two members of the road crew were involved in an accident while driving their van from Oakland to Denver, resulting in the cancellation of the rest of the band's 2019 shows.

On October 7, 2022, SWMRS announced their return via social media posts. In the following weeks, they released a statement regarding their misconduct allegations and announced upcoming shows. On November 4, 2022, they released the single Dye Yer Hair.

Joey Armstrong controversy
On July 20, 2020, Lydia Night of the Regrettes revealed she and drummer Joey Armstrong dated starting in 2017 when she was 16 and he was 22, accusing Armstrong of sexual assault, coercion, and other predatory behavior. In the post, Night claimed that Armstrong initiated the relationship by messaging her on Instagram that his band SWMRS would be sending her band "some offers for some tours that year". Night shared the allegations after reading SWMRS' statement condemning a wave of sexual assault allegations related to several Burger Records artists.

The following day, Armstrong responded on the SWMRS Instagram account, saying that while he disagreed "with some of the things [Lydia] said about me", that he had privately apologized to Night and asked for forgiveness. Armstrong's six-sentence response was considerably shorter than the band's five-page statement regarding Burger Records made one day prior, a contrast noted upon by both some media outlets and Night herself, who responded that the statement showed "everyone exactly who [Armstrong] and [his] band of imposters are".

Band members 

Current lineup
 Cole Becker – lead and backing vocals, rhythm guitar (2004–present); lead guitar (2004–2009)
 Max Becker – lead and backing vocals (2004–present); lead guitar (2014–present); bass guitar (2004–2014)
 Cade Becker – bass guitar, backing vocals (2022-present)
 Jamie Seiwert - drums, percussion, backing vocals (2022-present)

Former members
 Joey Armstrong – drums, percussion, backing vocals (2004–2020)
 Sebastian "Seb" Mueller –  bass guitar, backing vocals (2014–2020); saxophone (2013–2014; touring member)
 Travis Neumann  – lead guitar, backing vocals (2009–2014)

Touring musicians
 Henry Webb-Jenkins – rhythm guitar, backing vocals, keyboard (2019–2020)
 Jakob Danger Armstrong – bass guitar, backing vocals (2015); rhythm guitar, backing vocals, keyboards (2018–2019); lead guitar (2020)

Timeline

Discography
Studio albums
 Don't Be a Dick (2011) 
 Lost at Seventeen (2013) 
 Drive North (2016)
 Berkeley's on Fire (2019)

EPs
 Goody Two Shoes (2009) 
 Broadcast This (2010) 
 Regan MacNeil (2010) 
 Swim (2014) 
 Miley/Uncool (2015)

Demos
This Kid. (2008)

References

2004 establishments in California
Musical groups established in 2004
Musical groups from Berkeley, California
Musical quartets
Pop punk groups from California
Punk rock groups from California
Fueled by Ramen artists
Rise Records artists
Adeline Records artists